Epistrophe ("return") is the repetition of the same word or words at the end of successive phrases, clauses or sentences. It is also known as epiphora and occasionally as antistrophe. It is a figure of speech and the counterpart of anaphora. It is an extremely emphatic device because of the emphasis placed on the last word in a phrase or sentence.

Platonic epistrophe 

Greek epistrophe: "a word coined by Plato as a goal of philosophical education and the term adopted by early Christians for conversion".

Examples 
 "Where affections bear rule, their reason is subdued, honesty is subdued, good will is subdued, and all things else that withstand evil, for ever are subdued." — Thomas Wilson
 "... this nation, under God, shall have a new birth of freedom—and that government of the people, by the people, for the people, shall not perish from the earth." — Abraham Lincoln in the Gettysburg Address
 "When I was a child, I spoke as a child, I understood as a child, I thought as a child; but when I became a man, I put away childish things." —  The Apostle Paul, in the Bible, 1 Cor 13:11 (King James Translation) "There is no Negro problem. There is no Southern problem. There is no Northern problem. There is only an American problem." Lyndon B. Johnson in "We Shall Overcome"
 "What lies behind us and what lies before us are tiny compared to what lies within us." — Ralph Waldo Emerson
* "Hourly joys be still upon you!
Juno sings her blessings on you. ...
Scarcity and want shall shun you,
Ceres' blessing so is on you." — Shakespeare, The Tempest ''(4.1.108–109; 116–17)
 It was a creed written into the founding documents that declared the destiny of a nation.Yes we can.It was whispered by slaves and abolitionists as they blazed a trail towards freedom through the darkest of nights.Yes we can.It was sung by immigrants as they struck out from distant shores and pioneers who pushed westward against an unforgiving wilderness. Yes we can. It was the call of workers who organized; women who reached for the ballot; a President who chose the moon as our new frontier; and a King who took us to the mountaintop and pointed the way to the Promised Land. Yes we can to justice and equality. Yes we can to opportunity and prosperity. Yes we can heal this nation. Yes we can repair this world. Yes we can.
In the beginning of this quotation by Barack Obama epistrophe is evoked, while the latter part makes use of anaphora.

See also
 Anaphora
 Antimetabole
 Anthimeria
 Figure of speech
Epistrophy (composition), a jazz standard composed by Thelonious Monk and Kenny Clarke in 1941

References

External links 
 Audio illustrations of epistrophe
The Hermeneutics of the Subject: Lectures at the Collège de France 1981–1982

Figures of speech
Literary terminology
Poetic devices
Rhetorical techniques